Archie Blake (born 1906) is an American mathematician.
He is well known for the Blake canonical form, a normal form for expressions in propositional logic.
In order to compute the canonical form, he moreover introduced the concept of consensus, which was a precursor of the resolution principle, today a common technique in automated theorem proving.

Career
In 1930, he became a member of the American Mathematical Society (AMS). He presented his canonical form at the AMS meeting at Columbia University on 29 Oct 1932.
In 1937, this work lead to a Ph.D. from the University of Chicago, supervised by Raymond Walter Barnard.

He worked for the U.S. Coast and Geodetic Survey in Washington, D.C., since 1936 (or earlier) as a Mathematician, since 1938 as an Assistant Mathematician, and since 1939 as an Associated Mathematician.
In 1946, he was appointed a Senior Statistician in the Office of the Army Surgeon General, Washington, D.C.
He also worked for the Cornell Aeronautical Laboratory in Buffalo, New York.
From there, he changed in 1954 to the Westinghouse Electric Corporation in Baltimore, Md., where he became an Advisory Engineer.
In 1956, he moved from Westinghouse to the Bendix Aviation Corporation, as a Systems Staff Mathematician.
In 1960, he became a Manager of the Analysis Section of Raytheon in Sudbury, Massachusetts.

Publications
  
  — Review in the Journal of Symbolic Logic — Abstract in Bulletin of the AMS, Vol.38, No.11, Nov 1932, p.6(805)
  — Also presented at the AMS 46th annual meeting, 26-29 Dec 1939 at the Ohio State University, Columbus, Ohio

References

1906 births
Year of death missing
University of Chicago alumni
20th-century American mathematicians
Bendix Corporation people